Field Marshal Jeffery Amherst, 1st Baron Amherst,  (29 January 1717 – 3 August 1797) was a British Army officer and Commander-in-Chief of the Forces in the British Army.  Amherst is  credited as the architect of Britain's successful campaign to conquer the territory of New France during the Seven Years' War. Under his command, British forces captured the cities of Louisbourg, Quebec City and Montreal, as well as several major fortresses. He was also the first British Governor General in the territories that eventually became Canada. Numerous places and streets are named for him, in both Canada and the United States.

Amherst's legacy is controversial due to his expressed desire to exterminate the race of indigenous people during Pontiac's War, and his alleged giving of blankets infected with smallpox as a weapon, notably at the Siege of Fort Pitt. This has led to a reconsideration of his legacy. In 2019, the city of Montreal removed his name from a street, renaming it Rue Atateken, from the Kanien'kéha Mohawk language.

Early life
Born the son of Jeffrey Amherst (d. 1750), a Kentish lawyer, and Elizabeth Amherst (née Kerrill), Jeffery Amherst was born in Sevenoaks, England, on 29 January 1717. At an early age, he became a page to the Duke of Dorset. Amherst became an ensign in the Grenadier Guards in 1735.

Amherst served in the War of the Austrian Succession becoming an aide to General John Ligonier and participating in the Battle of Dettingen in June 1743 and the Battle of Fontenoy in May 1745. Promoted to lieutenant colonel on 25 December 1745, he also saw action at the Battle of Rocoux in October 1746. He then became an aide to the Duke of Cumberland, the commander of the British forces, and saw further action at the Battle of Lauffeld in July 1747.

Seven Years' War

Germany 

In February 1756, Amherst was appointed commissar to the Hessian forces that had been assembled to defend Hanover as part of the Army of Observation: as it appeared likely a French invasion attempt against Britain itself was imminent, Amherst was ordered in April to arrange the transportation of thousands of the Germans to southern England to bolster Britain's defences. He was made colonel of the 15th Regiment of Foot on 12 June 1756. By 1757 as the immediate danger to Britain had passed the troops were moved back to Hanover to join a growing army under the Duke of Cumberland and Amherst fought with the Hessians under Cumberland's command at the Battle of Hastenbeck in July 1757: the Allied defeat there forced the army into a steady retreat northwards to Stade on the North Sea coast.

Amherst was left dispirited by the retreat and by the Convention of Klosterzeven by which Hanover agreed to withdraw from the war: he began to prepare to disband the Hessian troops under his command, only to receive word that the Convention had been repudiated and the Allied force was being reformed.

North America

French and Indian War 

Amherst gained fame during the Seven Years' War, particularly in the North American campaign known in the United States as the French and Indian War when he led the British attack on Louisbourg on Cape Breton Island in June 1758.

In the wake of this action, he was appointed commander-in-chief of the British army in North America and colonel-in-chief of the 60th (Royal American) Regiment in September 1758. Amherst then led an army against French troops on Lake Champlain, where he captured Fort Ticonderoga in July 1759, while another army under William Johnson took Niagara also in July 1759 and James Wolfe besieged and eventually captured Quebec with a third army in September 1759. Amherst served as the nominal Crown Governor of Virginia from 12 September 1759.

From July 1760, Amherst led an army down the Saint Lawrence River from Fort Oswego, joined with Brigadier Murray from Quebec and Brigadier Haviland from Ile-aux-Noix in a three-way pincer, and captured Montreal, ending French rule in North America on 8 September. He infuriated the French commanders by refusing them the honours of war; the Chevalier de Lévis burned the colours rather than surrendering them, to highlight his differences with Vaudreuil for later political advantage back in France.

The British settlers were relieved and proclaimed a day of thanksgiving. Boston newspapers recount how the occasion was celebrated with a parade, a grand dinner in Faneuil Hall, music, bonfires, and firing of cannon. Rev. Thomas Foxcroft of the First Church in Boston offered thus:

In recognition of this victory, Amherst was appointed Governor-General of British North America in September 1760 and promoted to major-general on 29 November 1760. He was appointed Knight of the Order of the Bath on 11 April 1761.

From his base at New York, Amherst oversaw the dispatch of troops under Monckton and Haviland to take part in British expeditions in the West Indies that led to the British capture of Dominica in 1761 and Martinique and Cuba in 1762.

Pontiac's War

The uprising of many Native American tribes in the Ohio Valley and Great Lakes region, commonly referred to as Pontiac's War after one of its most notable leaders, began in early 1763.  From 1753, when the French first invaded the territory, to February 1763, when peace was formally declared between the English and French, the Six Nations and tenant tribes always maintained that both the French and the British must remain east of the Allegheny Mountains. After the British failed to keep their word to withdraw from the Ohio and Allegheny valleys, a loose confederation of Native American tribes including the Delawares, the Shawnees, the Senecas, the Mingoes, the Mohicans, the Miamis, the Ottawas and the Wyandots, who were opposed to British post-war occupation of the region, banded together in an effort to drive the British out of their territory.

One of the most infamous and well-documented issues during Pontiac's War was the use of biological warfare against Native Americans and Amherst's role in supporting it. Colonel Henry Bouquet, the commander of Fort Pitt, ordered smallpox-infested blankets to be given Native Americans when a group of them laid siege to the fortification in June 1763. During a parley in midst of the siege on 24 June 1763, Captain Simeon Ecuyer gave representatives of the besieging Delawares two blankets and a handkerchief enclosed in small metal boxes that had been exposed to smallpox, in an attempt to spread the disease to the Natives in order to end the siege. William Trent, the trader turned militia commander who had come up with the plan, sent an invoice to the British colonial authorities in North America indicating that the purpose of giving the blankets was "to Convey the Smallpox to the Indians." The invoice was approved by Thomas Gage, then serving as Commander-in-Chief, North America. Reporting on parleys with Delaware chiefs on 24 June, Trent wrote: '[We] gave them two Blankets and an Handkerchief out of the Small Pox Hospital. I hope it will have the desired effect.' The military hospital records confirm that two blankets and handkerchiefs were 'taken from people in the Hospital to Convey the Smallpox to the Indians.' The fort commander paid for these items, which he certified 'were had for the uses above mentioned.' A reported outbreak that began the spring before left as many as one hundred Native Americans dead in Ohio Country from 1763 to 1764. It is not clear, however, whether the smallpox was a result of the Fort Pitt incident or the virus was already present among the Delaware people as outbreaks happened on their own every dozen or so years and the delegates were met again later and they seemingly had not contracted smallpox.

A month later the use of smallpox blankets was discussed by Amherst himself in letters to Bouquet.  Amherst, having learned that smallpox had broken out among the garrison at Fort Pitt, and after learning of the loss of his forts at Venango, Le Boeuf and Presqu'Isle, wrote to Colonel Bouquet:

Could it not be contrived to send the small pox among the disaffected tribes of Indians? We must on this occasion use every stratagem in our power to reduce them.

Bouquet, who was already marching to relieve Fort Pitt from the siege, agreed with this suggestion in a postscript when he responded to Amherst just days later on 13 July 1763:

P.S. I will try to inocculate  the Indians by means of Blankets that may fall in their hands, taking care however not to get the disease myself. As it is pity to oppose good men against them, I wish we could make use of the Spaniard's Method, and hunt them with English Dogs. Supported by Rangers, and some Light Horse, who would I think effectively extirpate or remove that Vermine.

In response, also in a postscript, Amherst replied:

P.S. You will Do well to try to Innoculate  the Indians by means of Blankets, as well as to try Every other method that can serve to Extirpate this Execrable Race. I should be very glad your Scheme for Hunting them Down by Dogs could take Effect, but England is at too great a Distance to think of that at present.

Amherst was summoned home, ostensibly so that he could be consulted on future military plans in North America, and was replaced pro tem as Commander-in-Chief, North America by Thomas Gage. Amherst expected to be praised for his conquest of Canada, however, once in London, he was instead asked to account for the recent Native American rebellion. He was forced to defend his conduct, and faced complaints made by William Johnson and George Croghan, who lobbied the Board of Trade for his removal and permanent replacement by Gage.  He was also severely criticised by military subordinates on both sides of the Atlantic.  Nevertheless, Amherst was promoted to lieutenant-general on 26 March 1765, and became colonel of the 3rd Regiment of Foot in November 1768.

On 22 October 1772, Amherst was appointed Lieutenant-General of the Ordnance, and he soon gained the confidence of George III, who had initially hoped the position would go to a member of the Royal Family. On 6 November 1772, he became a member of the Privy Council.

American Revolutionary War

Amherst was raised to the peerage on 14 May 1776, as Baron Amherst, of Holmesdale in the County of Kent. On 24 March 1778 he was promoted to full general and, in April 1778, he became Commander-in-Chief of the Forces, which gave him a seat in the Cabinet.

In 1778, when the British commander in North America, William Howe, requested to be relieved, Amherst was considered as a replacement by the government: however, his insistence that it would require 75,000 troops to fully defeat the rebellion was not acceptable to the government, and Henry Clinton was instead chosen to take over from Howe in America. Following the British setback at Saratoga, Amherst successfully argued for a limited war in North America, keeping footholds along the coast, defending Canada, East and West Florida, and the West Indies while putting more effort into the war at sea. On 7 November 1778 the King and Queen visited Amherst at his home, Montreal Park, in Kent and on 24 April 1779 he became colonel of the 2nd Troop of Horse Grenadier Guards.

A long-standing plan of the French had been the concept of an invasion of Great Britain which they hoped would lead to a swift end to the war if it was successful: in 1779 Spain entered the war on the side of France, and the increasingly depleted state of British home forces made an invasion more appealing and Amherst organised Britain's land defences in anticipation of the invasion which never materialised.

Gordon Riots

In June 1780, Amherst oversaw the British army as they suppressed the anti-Catholic Gordon Riots in London.  After the outbreak of rioting Amherst deployed the small London garrison of Horse and Foot Guards as best as he could but was hindered by the reluctance of the civil magistrates to authorise decisive action against the rioters. 

Line troops and militia were brought in from surrounding counties, swelling the forces at Amherst's disposal to over 15,000, many of whom were quartered in tents in Hyde Park, and a form of martial law was declared, giving the troops the authority to fire on crowds if the Riot Act had first been read. Although order was eventually restored, Amherst was personally alarmed by the failure of the authorities to suppress the riots. 

In the wake of the Gordon Riots, Amherst was forced to resign as Commander-in-Chief in February 1782 and was replaced by Henry Conway. On 23 March 1782 he became captain and colonel of the 2nd Troop of Horse Guards.

Later life

French Revolutionary Wars
On 8 July 1788, he became colonel of the 2nd Regiment of Life Guards and on 30 August 1788 he was created Baron Amherst (this time with the territorial designation of Montreal in the County of Kent) with a special provision that would allow this title to pass to his nephew (as Amherst was childless, the Holmesdale title became extinct upon his death). 

With the advent of the French Revolutionary Wars, Amherst was recalled as Commander-in-Chief of the Forces in January 1793: however is generally criticised for allowing the armed forces to slide into acute decline, a direct cause of the failure of the early campaigns in the Low Countries: Pitt the Younger said of him "his age, and perhaps his natural temper, are little suited to the activity and the energy which the present moment calls for". Horace Walpole called him "that log of wood whose stupidity and incapacity are past belief". "He allowed innumerable abuses to grow up in the army… He kept his command, though almost in his dotage, with a tenacity that cannot be too much censured".

Family and death
In 1753 he married Jane Dalison (1723–1765). Following her death he married Elizabeth Cary (1740–1830), daughter of Lieutenant General George Cary (1712–1792), who later became Lady Amherst of Holmesdale, on 26 March 1767. There were no children by either marriage. He retired from that post in February 1795, to be replaced by the Duke of York, and was promoted to the rank of field marshal on 30 July 1796. He retired to his home at Montreal Park and died on 3 August 1797. He was buried in the Parish Church at Sevenoaks.

Legacy
Several places are named for him: Amherstburg, Ontario (location of General Amherst High School), Amherst, Massachusetts (location of the University of Massachusetts Amherst, Hampshire College and Amherst College), Amherst, New Hampshire, Amherst, Nova Scotia, Amherst, New York and Amherst County, Virginia.

Amherst's desire to exterminate the indigenous people is now viewed as a dark stain on his legacy and various agencies, municipalities and institutions have reconsidered the use of the name "Amherst". "The Un-Canadians", a 2007 article in The Beaver, includes Amherst in a list of people in the history of Canada who are considered contemptible by the authors, because he "supported plans of distributing smallpox-infested blankets to First Nations people".

In 2008, Mi'kmaq spiritual leader John Joe Sark called the name of Fort Amherst Park of Prince Edward Island a "terrible blotch on Canada", and said: "To have a place named after General Amherst would be like having a city in Jerusalem named after Adolf Hitler...it's disgusting."  Sark raised his concerns again in a 29 January 2016 letter to the Canadian government.  Mi'kmaq historian Daniel N. Paul, who referred to Amherst as motivated by white supremacist beliefs, also supports a name change, saying: "in the future I don't think there should ever be anything named after people who committed what can be described as crimes against humanity."  In February 2016, a spokesperson for Parks Canada said it would review the matter after a proper complaint is filed; "Should there be a formal request from the public to change the name of the National Historic Site, Parks Canada would engage with the Historic Sites and Monuments Board of Canada for its recommendation." An online petition was launched by Sark to satisfy this formal request requirement on 20 February 2016. The park is known as Port-la-Joye–Fort Amherst National Historic Site and one of Parks Canada's partners for the site is the Mi'kmaq Confederacy of PEI.

In 2009, Montreal City Councillor Nicolas Montmorency officially asked that Rue Amherst be renamed: "it is totally unacceptable that a man who made comments supporting the extermination of Native Americans to be honoured in this way". On 13 September 2017, the city of Montreal decided that the street bearing his name would be renamed. On 21 June 2019, the street was officially renamed Rue Atateken, atateken being a Kanien'kehá word describing "those with whom one shares values," according to Kanehsatake historian Hilda Nicholas.

In 2016, Amherst College dropped its "Lord Jeffery" mascot at the instigation of the students. It also  renamed the Lord Jeffery Inn, a campus hotel owned by the college, to the Inn on Boltwood in early 2019.

See also
 List of Governors General of Canada
 Turtleheart

Explanatory notes

References

Citations

General bibliography 
 Amherst, Jeffery (1931). The journal of Jeffery Amherst, recording the military career of General Amherst in America from 1758 to 1763 (Webster, John Clarence, ed) Toronto: The Ryerson Press; Chicago: University of Chicago Press
 
 
 
 
 
 
 
 
 
 
 
 
 
 
 
 
 
 Middleton, Richard, Pontiac's War: Its Causes, Course and Consequences  New York and London, Routledge, 2007   
 
 
 
 
 Whitworth, Rex (February 1959). "Field-Marshal Lord Amherst: A Military Enigma" . History Today 9#2 pp. 132–137.

External links

 Jeffery Amherst Collection at the Amherst College Archives & Special Collections
 Jeffery Amherst papers, William L. Clements Library, University of Michigan.
 Prof. Kevin Sweeney on Jeffery Amherst in America
 
 Historical Biographies: Jeffrey Amherst
 Amherst and Smallpox
 Amherst in the Haldimand Papers
 Amherst and Smallpox Blankets – Excerpts from actual letters in which Lord Jeffery Amherst approves smallpox plan (dated 16 July 1763) and discusses other methods of killing Native Americans with Colonel Henry Bouquet. 
 Jeffrey Amherst and Smallpox Blankets – Extensive discussion and documentation of Amherst's involvement in warfare against Native Americans and the smallpox blanket tactics (University of Massachusetts Amherst)
 1759 From the Warpath to the Plains of Abraham ( Virtual Exhibition)
 National Battlefields Commission (Plains of Abraham)
 
 

1717 births
1797 deaths
Amherst County, Virginia
Amherst, Nova Scotia
Barons in the Peerage of Great Britain
People related to biological warfare
British Army personnel of the American Revolutionary War
British Army personnel of the French and Indian War
British Army personnel of the Seven Years' War
British Army personnel of the War of the Austrian Succession
British field marshals
British Life Guards officers
British people of Pontiac's War
Buffs (Royal East Kent Regiment) officers
Colonial governors of Virginia
East Yorkshire Regiment officers
Governors of British North America
Governors of the Province of Quebec (1763–1791)
Knights Companion of the Order of the Bath
Peers of Great Britain created by George III
People from Sevenoaks
Military personnel from Kent